{{Infobox station
| name          = Plaza de los Virreyes - Eva Perón
| symbol = E | symbol_location = buenosaires
| type          = 
| style         =
| image         = File:Cevallos-3.jpg
| image_caption = 
| address       = Lafuente 1000
| coordinates   = 
| line          = 
| connections   = 
| structure     = 
| platform      = Island platforms
| depth         = 
| levels        = 
| tracks        = 
| parking       = 
| bicycle       = 
| opened        = 8 May 1986
| closed        = 
| rebuilt       = 
| electrified   = 
| disabled      = 
| code          = 
| owned         = 
| zone          = 
| former        =
| passengers    = 
| pass_year     = 
| pass_percent  = 
| pass_system   = 
| mpassengers   = 
| services      = {{Adjacent stations|system=Buenos Aires Underground|line=Line E|right=Varela|note-mid=Transfer to:  Intendente Saguier}}
| map_locator   = 
}}
Plaza de los Virreyes - Eva Perón is a station on Line E of the Buenos Aires Underground and is the current terminus. The station was opened on 8 May 1986 as the western terminus of the one-line extension from Varela. It was originally called Plaza de los Virreyes; however, Eva Perón'' was added to the name of the station to commemorate Eva Duarte de Perón, the prominent Argentine historical figure. The Premetro connects here at Intendente Saguier station.

This station is the southernmost metro station in the world.

References

External links

Buenos Aires Underground stations